The 2015 Nobel Prize in Literature was awarded to the Belarusian journalist Svetlana Alexievich (born 1948) "for her polyphonic writings, a monument to suffering and courage in our time". She described as the first journalist and the first Belerusian national to receive the Nobel prize since December 10, 2015.

Laureate

Alexievich depicts life during and after the Soviet Union through the experience of individuals. In her books, she uses interviews to create a collage of a wide range of voices. With her "documentary novels", Alexievich, who is a journalist, moves in the boundary between reporting and fiction. Her major works includes the Chernobylskaya molitva ("Voices from Chernobyl: The Oral History of a Nuclear Disaster", 1997) and U voyny ne zhenskoe litso ("The Unwomanly Face of War: An Oral History of Women in World War II", 1985). Her books criticize political regimes in both the Soviet Union and later Belarus as in Vremya sekond khend ("Secondhand Time: The Last of the Soviets", 2013).

"Documentary Literature"
Alexievich herself rejects the notion that she is a journalist, and, in fact, Alexievich’s chosen genre is sometimes called "documentary literature": an artistic rendering of real events, with a degree of poetic license. In her own words:

Nobel lecture and award ceremony
Alexievich delivered a Nobel lecture on December 7, 2015 entitled On the Battle Lost, which was originally in Russian. In her lecture, she depicted life during and after the Soviet Union through the various experience of individuals based on interviews and creating them into collages of memories.

Sara Danius, in the presentation of the award, said:

Gallery
 8 October 2015: Announcement of the 2015 Nobel Prize laureate in Literature in Stockholm by the Permanent Secretary Sara Danius.

References

External links
Prize announcement 2015 nobelprize.org
Award Ceremony nobelprize.org
Award ceremony speech nobelprize.org

2015